Antonio de San Gregorio (died 1661) was a Roman Catholic prelate who was appointed as Bishop of Nueva Caceres, Philippines from 1659 to 1661.

Biography
Antonio de San Gregorio was ordained a priest in the Order of Friars Minor. On 17 November 1659, he was appointed during the papacy of Pope Alexander VII as Bishop of Nueva Caceres. He died before he was consecrated in 1661.

References

External links and additional sources
 (for Chronology of Bishops) 
 (for Chronology of Bishops) 

17th-century Roman Catholic bishops in the Philippines
Bishops appointed by Pope Alexander VII
1661 deaths
Franciscan bishops